Lieutenant-General William Staveley  (29 July 1784 – 4 April 1854) was a British Army officer who fought in the Peninsular War and later became Commander and Lieutenant Governor of Hong Kong.

Military career

Staveley was born in York, the son of William Staveley and Henrietta Henderson. He entered the British Army in 1798 as an ensign.  Staveley fought in several conflicts in the Peninsular War (Battle of Talavera, Battle of Fuentes de Onoro, Battle of Vittoria, Battle of the Pyrenees, Battle of Toulouse, Siege of Ciudad Rodrigo and Battle of Badajoz and many other minor actions).

At the 1815 Battle of Waterloo, Staveley was present as a captain in the Royal Staff Corps, afterwards receiving the Companion of the Bath (CB) and a promotion to brevet Lieutenant-colonel.

He went to Mauritius in 1821 and served in various roles (deputy quartermaster-general and commandant of Port Louis) before becoming Commander and Lieutenant Governor of Hong Kong in 1847.

After leaving Hong Kong in 1851, he was given command of the Bombay Army. In 1853, he was made Colonel of the 24th Regiment of Foot and appointed commander-in-chief of the Madras Army (with local rank of lieutenant-general). He died in the Nilgiri Hills, and was buried at Ootacamund.

Staveley Street

Staveley Street is a street in Central on the Hong Kong Island, Hong Kong, named after Staveley. The street is for pedestrians only and parallel to Peel Street.

Family
He married Sarah Mather in 1817.  Their children included Charles William Dunbar Staveley, Harriet Frances Staveley, and Caroline Octavia Emma Staveley, who in 1847 married Talavera Vernon Anson RN.

References

External links
Jackson, Louis (1935). "One of Wellington's Staff Officers: Lieut.-General William Staveley, C.B.". Journal of the Society for Army Historical Research 14 (55): 155–166.
Bibliography in Staveley genealogy
His son's bibliography in Worcestershire Regiment

|-
 

|-
 

1784 births
1854 deaths
British Army generals
British Army personnel of the Napoleonic Wars
Commanders of Hong Kong
Companions of the Order of the Bath
Military personnel from York
Royal Staff Corps officers